Klingenbach is a town in the Eisenstadt-Umgebung district in the Austrian state of Burgenland.

Klingenbach may also refer to:

 Klingenbach (Bühler), a river of Baden-Württemberg, Germany, tributary of the Bühler
 Klingenbach (Goldbach), a river of Bavaria, Germany, tributary to the Flutgraben
 Klingenbach (Igelsbach), a river of Bavaria, Germany, tributary of the Igelsbach
 Klingenbach (Jagst, Steinbach an der Jagst), a river of Baden-Württemberg, Germany, tributary of the Jagst